General Henry Phipps, 1st Earl of Mulgrave,  (14 February 17557 April 1831), styled The Honourable Henry Phipps until 1792 and known as The Lord Mulgrave from 1792 to 1812, was a British soldier and politician. He notably served as Foreign Secretary under William Pitt the Younger from 1805 to 1806.

Background and education
Lord Mulgrave was a younger son of Constantine Phipps, 1st Baron Mulgrave of New Ross), by his wife the Hon. Lepell, daughter of John Hervey, 2nd Baron Hervey, and was educated at Eton and the Middle Temple.

Military career
Lord Mulgrave entered the army in 1775, and eventually rose to the rank of General. He saw service in the Caribbean during the American Revolutionary War. In 1793 he was made Colonel of the 31st (Huntingdonshire) Regiment of Foot. Also in 1793, because he was on a mission to the King of Sardinia in Turin, he was near at hand when British forces captured the French port of Toulon, and he briefly took command of the British land forces there, before withdrawing upon the arrival of more senior officers. In 1799 he was sent out on another special military mission, this time to the headquarters of the Austrian commander, Archduke Charles, to attempt to persuade him to retain his troops in Switzerland rather than removing them to the Middle Rhine, but he was unsuccessful.

Political career
In 1784 Lord Mulgrave was elected to the House of Commons for Totnes. He supported the government of Pitt, to whom he eventually became close. In 1790, he was elected for Scarborough in Yorkshire. He succeeded his brother Constantine Phipps, 2nd Baron Mulgrave as Baron Mulgrave in the Peerage of Ireland in 1792, but did not succeed to his brother's British title. In 1794 he was granted a British peerage as Baron Mulgrave, entering the House of Lords, and in 1796 he was made Governor of Scarborough Castle. Mulgrave supported Pitt when he resigned in 1801, and in return for his loyalty was rewarded with the office of Chancellor of the Duchy of Lancaster (1804–1805) in Pitt's second government. Following an accident suffered by Lord Harrowby, Mulgrave took his place as Foreign Secretary, in which position he helped Pitt to form the Third Coalition against Napoleon.

The post of Foreign Secretary was generally thought to be beyond his powers. Thomas Grenville, writing to the Marquis of Buckingham, expressed an opinion that he was only "put in ad interim until Lord Wellesley's arrival, who is expected in June". Mulgrave, however, showed himself fairly capable in debate. On 11 February 1805 he had to announce the breach with Spain, and to defend the seizure of the treasure ships at Ferrol before the declaration of war, and on 20 June to defend the coalition of 1805. He composed an ode on the victory of Trafalgar, and it was set to music by Thomas Arne. On 23 January 1806 Pitt died. On 28 January 1806 Mulgrave laid before the House of Lords copies of the treaties recently concluded with Russia and Sweden, to which Prussia and Austria had acceded, and on 4 February he explained their object. Three days later, on 7 February, he resigned, with the bulk of those who had been Pitt's friends.

With the death of Pitt and the formation of the Ministry of All the Talents in 1806, Mulgrave, along with the other Pittites, went into opposition, but when the Pittites returned to power in 1807, Mulgrave served in various major offices, first as First Lord of the Admiralty (1807–1810), then as Master-General of the Ordnance (1810–1819), and finally as Minister without Portfolio (1819–1820). As First Lord he was heavily involved in planning both the successful expedition against Copenhagen in 1807, and the disastrous one to Walcheren in 1809. After moving to the ordnance board, Mulgrave became less active politically. In 1812, he was created Viscount Normanby and Earl of Mulgrave in the Peerage of the United Kingdom.

Family
The Earl of Mulgrave's grandfather William Phipps had married Lady Catherine Annesley, who was the daughter and heiress of James Annesley, 3rd Earl of Anglesey, and his wife, Lady Catherine Darnley (an illegitimate daughter of King James II by his mistress Catherine Sedley, Countess of Dorchester). Lady Catherine Darnley had later married John Sheffield, 1st Duke of Buckingham and Normanby, and hence Henry Phipps, 1st Earl of Mulgrave, was the step-great-grandson of the 1st Duke of Buckingham and Normanby.

Lord Mulgrave married Martha Sophia, daughter of pottery manufacturer Christopher Thomson Maling, at St Michael's, Houghton-le-Spring in 1795. He died in April 1831, aged 76, and was succeeded by his eldest son, Constantine, who was later created Marquess of Normanby. His second son was the Hon. Sir Charles Beaumont Phipps and his third, Edmund Phipps, a lawyer and author. The couple's fourth son, the Hon. Augustus Frederick (b. 1809) became honorary canon of Ely. Of their five daughters, only one survived childhood.

The Countess of Mulgrave died on 17 October 1849.

See also
Ramsay Weston Phipps

References

Attribution:

External links

1755 births
1831 deaths
British Army generals
British Secretaries of State
Chancellors of the Duchy of Lancaster
Peers of Great Britain created by George III
Earls in the Peerage of the United Kingdom
Lords of the Admiralty
Mulgrave, Henry Phipps, 3rd Baron
British MPs 1784–1790
British MPs 1790–1796
British Secretaries of State for Foreign Affairs
British Army personnel of the American Revolutionary War
Knights Grand Cross of the Order of the Bath
Members of the Privy Council of the United Kingdom
Henry
People educated at Eton College